New York's 50th State Assembly district is one of the 150 districts in the New York State Assembly. It has been represented by Emily Gallagher since 2021. She defeated then 48-year Assemblyman Joe Lentol in the 2020 Democratic primary.

Geography

2020s
District 50 is in Brooklyn. It contains Greenpoint and parts of Williamsburg.

2010s
District 50 is in Brooklyn. It contains parts of Greenpoint, Clinton Hill, Williamsburg and Fort Greene. The Brooklyn Navy Yard is located within this district.

Recent election results

2022

2020

2018
}}

2016
}}

2014
}}

2012
}}

2010

References 

Politics of Brooklyn
50